The D12 is a partially built state road in central Croatia that is intended to connect the Vrbovec 2 interchange (with D10) with Bjelovar, Virovitica and end at the border crossing Terezino Polje (with Hungary).

Planned upgrade to motorway

The A13 motorway was a planned motorway, expected to be built in the central Croatia northeast from Vrbovec, extending towards the cities of Bjelovar and Virovitica. As of May 2012, only the Vrbovec 2 interchange, the starting (western) terminus of the A13 has been completed. The route was planned to be built as a six lane motorway and extended northeast to Bjelovar, Virovitica and Terezino Polje border crossing to Hungary.

The A13 motorway represented the eastern arm of the so-called Podravina Y, as the western arm is the partially constructed A12 motorway. The A13 was planned to branch off from the A12 at the Vrbovec 2 interchange, which is largely completed, although it may not be used by motorists driving on the A12 as that exit is currently blocked. Construction of the motorway was cancelled in June 2012.

Planned construction

The first construction stage was scheduled to include the section between the existing Vrbovec 2 interchange and Bjelovar, where the motorway would default to the D43 state road. Four interchanges, apart from the Vrbovec 2, were planned on that section: Kapela and Farkaševac interchanges to the Ž3041 (to Haganj) and Ž2231 (to Kenđelovec and Farkaševac) county roads respectively, Gudovac to the D28 state road to the western parts of Bjelovar and Bjelovar interchange to the D43 state road and the northern and the eastern parts of the city. The works related to the first part of the route were officially announced in 2009, however no construction took place for more than a year, causing delay of planned completion of the motorway until 2013.

On 16 April 2019 the first part between the Vrbovec 2 interchange and Farkaševac was opened.

Criticism and cancellation
The A13 had been formally announced in May 2009, but actual project planning, issuing of permits and construction works were delayed and postponed to an undetermined date, drawing criticism of the project as a pre-election stunt for the local elections of 2009. On 2 May 2012, management of Hrvatske autoceste announced cancellation of construction of the motorway, pending approval of its supervisory board. The company reported that funding was never secured for construction of the route, while declining to comment on possible payment of damages to contractors. By May 2012, Strabag, a motorway contractor, demanded 30 million kuna ( 4 million euro) in damages because of delay of construction, but the request was declined by Hrvatske autoceste citing failure of Strabag to fulfill its contractual obligations. On 20 June 2012, the Government of Croatia cancelled construction of the motorway.

Exit list

{| class="wikitable"
|- 
!scope="col"|County
!scope="col"|km
!scope="col"|Exit
!scope="col"|Name
!scope="col"|Destination
!scope="col"|Notes
|-
| rowspan=2|Zagreb County
| 0.0
| align=center | 1
| Vrbovec 2
| 
| Connection to the A12 and the rest of the Croatian motorway network.The western terminus of the motorway.
|-
| 10.6
| align=center | 2
| Farkaševac
| 
| Connection to Kenđelovec and Farkaševac.
|-
| rowspan=2|Bjelovar-Bilogora
| bgcolor=#ffdead |
| bgcolor=#ffdead align=center | 3
| bgcolor=#ffdead |Gudovac
| bgcolor=#ffdead |-
| bgcolor=#ffdead |Connection to planned Gudovac business zone.
|-
| bgcolor=#ffdead |27.5
| bgcolor=#ffdead align=center | 4
| bgcolor=#ffdead |Bjelovar
| bgcolor=#ffdead |
| bgcolor=#ffdead |Connection to Bjelovar.The eastern terminus of the first section of the A13.

Sources 

D012
A13